The 2004 Indian general election were held in Indian state West Bengal in 2004 to elect all 42 seats of Lok Sabha in the state. The election took place on 10 May 2004 and a turnout of 77.7% was recorded.

The Communist Party of India (Marxist) led  Left Front had an overwhelming victory in the state by winning 35 seats. On the national level, Indian National Congress became the single largest party and formed the new government with its allies and taking external support from Left Front and other parties.

Schedule 
The election schedule was declared by Election Commission of India on 29 February 2004.

Parties and alliances

Other Left Front members that didn't fielded candidates in the election but supported the alliance were Biplobi Bangla Congress, Democratic Socialist Party, Marxist Forward Bloc, West Bengal Socialist Party, Revolutionary Communist Party of India and other left front parties.

Gorkha National Liberation Front supported the Congress candidate in Darjeeling constituency.



Results

Alliance-wise result

Party-wise result

Constituency-wise result

See also
2004 Indian general election
2001 West Bengal Legislative Assembly election
2006 West Bengal Legislative Assembly election

References

West Bengal
Indian general elections in West Bengal